The 2015 American Athletic Conference men's basketball tournament was played from March 12–15, 2015, at the XL Center in Hartford, Connecticut.

Seeds
Teams were seeded by conference record, with a ties broken by record between the tied teams followed by record against the regular-season champion, if necessary. The top five seeds received first round byes.

Schedule
All tournament games are nationally televised on an ESPN network:

Bracket

References

American Athletic Conference men's basketball tournament
2014–15 American Athletic Conference men's basketball season
Basketball competitions in Hartford, Connecticut
College basketball tournaments in Connecticut
2015 in sports in Connecticut